Choices of the Heart is an American made-for-television drama film based on the lives of the American Roman Catholic missionaries Jean Donovan, Dorothy Kazel, Maura Clarke, and Ita Ford, all of whom were murdered in El Salvador in 1980 during the Salvadoran Civil War. The story primarily focuses on Donovan, played by Melissa Gilbert. The film also depicts the assassination of Salvadoran Archbishop Oscar Romero, which occurred shortly before the women were killed.

Plot
As the film opens, Jean Donovan and Sister Dorothy Kazel meet Sisters Maura Clarke and Ita Ford at the El Salvador airport, and the four pile into a van driven by Jean for the trip back to the mission where Jean and Dorothy live and work. Shortly after leaving the airport, the van is stopped by a group of armed soldiers. The women then go missing and the US Ambassador to El Salvador, Robert White, searches for them, eventually finding their bodies in a shallow grave. White's search for the women and then for answers about what happened to them is interspersed with flashbacks of Jean's life.

In college, Jean drinks and parties with her friends during a study abroad year in Dublin, until she is contacted by Father Phelan, a Catholic priest seeking help with his ministry to the local poor. Self-centered and initially uninterested, Jean slowly becomes drawn to helping those in need. Back in the US, Jean lands a high-paying job with a business consulting firm, allowing her to spend freely on expensive toys such as a new car and a motorcycle, but she soon feels dissatisfied with her hedonistic lifestyle. Although she has begun a serious relationship with medical student Doug Cable, she applies for a Catholic lay missionary program and is sent to El Salvador, where she works with Sister Dorothy Kazel to help the local poor.

Jean's assertive manner in standing up against injustice soon draws negative attention from the Salvadoran military, who run the area (with the support of the US government) and harass and intimidate the residents. A mutual romantic attraction develops between Jean and Armando, a local youth who is preparing for the Catholic priesthood. Armando sneaks over to Jean's house in the middle of the night, but Jean, realizing their feelings for each other are wrong, sends him away, only to have him be shot dead by soldiers as he is leaving. The charismatic Archbishop of El Salvador, Oscar Romero, who is loved and admired by the people, is also assassinated by the military for speaking out against their oppressive and violent regime.

Despite Jean's grief and the obvious danger, plus a threat from Doug that he will end their relationship if Jean doesn't come home to the US, Jean cannot bring herself to leave El Salvador, especially when she thinks of the Salvadoran children she has grown to love. Jean's refusal to leave eventually results in a military death squad raping, torturing, and killing her along with the three religious sisters she was driving to the mission house. Ambassador White's attempt to get justice for Jean and her companions is frustrated by lack of cooperation from both the Salvadoran and US governments.

Background 
 
The film is based on actual events. On December 2, 1980, a few months after the March assassination of Archbishop Romero, the three Roman Catholic religious sisters Maura Clark, Ita Ford and Dorothy Kazel, and the lay Catholic missionary Jean Donovan, were raped, tortured, and murdered by a Salvadoran death squad, possibly funded by the United States. The sisters had dedicated years of their lives to working with refugees and the poor in El Salvador and elsewhere.  Lay missionary Jean Donovan had been in El Salvador for over two years helping the poor, especially children, and repeatedly expressed in her letters to her family in the U.S. that God brought her to El Salvador. Attempts were made by the Salvadoran and American governments to try to cover up the murders.

Production
The production was filmed mostly in Mexico. Mike Farrell plays Robert C. White, then U.S. President Jimmy Carter's Ambassador to El Salvador, who keeps running into official interference and noncooperation in his investigation concerning the murdered women.  Martin Sheen appears as Matt Phelan, a Dublin priest whom Donovan meets while spending her junior college year in Ireland.

Cast
 Melissa Gilbert - Jean Donovan  
 Peter Horton - Doug (Douglas Cable)  
 Helen Hunt - Cathy  
 Mary McCusker - Sister Maura Clarke  
 Mari Gorman - Sister Ita Ford  
 Pamela Bellwood - Sister Dorothy Kazel  
 Patrick Cassidy - Patrick  
 René Enríquez - Archbishop Romero  
 Mike Farrell - Ambassador Robert E. White  
 Martin Sheen - Father Phelan  
 Demián Bichir - Armando  
 Enrique Lucero - Colonel Rojas  
 Delores Devine - Gwen 
 George Belanger - Father Rich

References

External links
 
John J. O'Connor New York Times, December 5 1983: "TV: DRAMA OF CHURCHWOMEN SLAIN IN EL SALVADOR"
New York Times Arts Section, December 5 1983, comprehensive article
movies.nytimes.com: review summary and movie details
movies.msn.com: Choices of the Heart: overview, cast, synopsis, and ratings
videoeta.com: cast verification
hollywood.com: synopsis, cast, and production information
allmovie.com: film information and plot synopsis
spout.com: film synopsis and reviews
Entertainment Weekly, February 21 1992: "LADIES-IN-WAITING", Melissa Gilbert listed as "most memorable" for Choices of the Heart
InterReligious Task Force on Central America: "Martyrs of Central America & Colombia"
thebiographychannel.co.uk: biography of Martin Sheen

1983 television films
1983 films
1983 drama films
Films directed by Joseph Sargent
NBC network original films
Films about activists
Films about Catholic nuns
Films about the Salvadoran Civil War
1980 murders of U.S. missionaries in El Salvador
Cultural depictions of Óscar Romero
American drama television films
1980s English-language films
1980s American films